The 2001 Mid-American Conference baseball tournament took place in May 2001. The top six regular season finishers met in the double-elimination tournament held at Ball Diamond on the campus of Ball State University in Muncie, Indiana. This was the thirteenth Mid-American Conference postseason tournament to determine a champion. Fourth seed  won its third tournament championship to earn the conference's automatic bid to the 2001 NCAA Division I baseball tournament.

Seeding and format 
The winner of each division claimed the top two seeds, while the next four finishers based on conference winning percentage only, regardless of division, participated in the tournament. The teams played double-elimination tournament. This was the fourth year of the six team tournament.

Results

All-Tournament Team 
The following players were named to the All-Tournament Team.

Most Valuable Player 
John VanBenschoten won the Tournament Most Valuable Player award. VanBenschoten played for Kent State.

References 

Tournament
Mid-American Conference Baseball Tournament
Mid-American Conference baseball tournament
Mid-American Conference baseball tournament